Francis A. Todhunter (1884-1963) was an American commercial artist and landscape painter.

Life
Todhunter was born in 1884 in San Francisco, California. He graduated from the California School of Design, later known as the San Francisco Art Institute.

Todhunter began his career as a commercial artist at the San Francisco Chronicle alongside Rube Goldberg and Bud Fisher. He worked for the advertising firm McCann-Erickson until 1949.

Todhunter was also a watercolor and oil painter, and he exhibited his work at the Oakland Art Gallery in 1942. Although he used Impressionist features, he was "not a true impressionist" because of the use of lines in his paintings. Todhunter devoted his time to painting the landscapes of Marin County until his death.

Todhunter resided in Mill Valley, California with his wife, Alice Serella, and their son, Norman; they were both painters. He died in 1963 in San Francisco. His widow died in 1969. His artwork can be seen at the Fine Arts Museums of San Francisco.

References

1884 births
1963 deaths
People from Mill Valley, California
San Francisco Art Institute alumni
Artists from San Francisco
Painters from California
American landscape painters
20th-century American painters